Emily L Thorpe (born 27 January 1999) is an English cricketer who currently plays for Middlesex. She plays as a right-arm leg break bowler. She previously played for Sunrisers.

Domestic career
Thorpe made her county debut in 2017, for Middlesex against Yorkshire. She was Middlesex's second-leading wicket-taker in the 2017 Women's Twenty20 Cup, with 8 wickets at an average of 18.50. In 2019, Thorpe achieved her List A best bowling figures, taking 3/24 in a victory over Berkshire. She took 1 wicket in four matches for the side in the 2021 Women's Twenty20 Cup. In the 2022 Women's Twenty20 Cup, she was Middlesex's joint-leading wicket-taker, with 7 wickets at an average of 12.14.

In 2020, Thorpe played for Sunrisers in the Rachael Heyhoe Flint Trophy. She appeared in two matches, scoring 23 runs but failing to take a wicket. In 2021, she played three matches for the side across the Rachael Heyhoe Flint Trophy and the 2021 Charlotte Edwards Cup, taking two wickets.

References

External links

1999 births
Living people
Place of birth missing (living people)
Middlesex women cricketers
Sunrisers women's cricketers